Advanced Automotive Design (AAD) is a South African automobile manufacturer located in Die Wilgers, Pretoria. The company was founded in 1995 by Brian Glover and Rhys Edwards. Shaka is a registered Trademark of the AAD.

In 1997, they showed their first vehicle called Shaka Nynya on the South Florida International Auto Show. This was a concept car similar to the Plymouth Prowler. In 2000, the car was launched as a series model exclusively built by orders.

Model Overview
 Shaka Giotto (since 2000, only South Africa)
 Shaka Nynya (since 2000)

External links 
official website of the official US importer (Glover Design, Dania Beach, Florida) (Archive Copy)
The Shaka Nynya on car-cat.com
The Shaka Nynya on aada-african-car.blogspot.com
The Shaka Nynya on sportcarsworld.com
The Shaka Nynya on vietbao.vn

Car manufacturers of South Africa
Manufacturing companies based in the City of Tshwane
Organisations based in Pretoria
Vehicle manufacturing companies established in 1995